Cora crispoleslia is a species of basidiolichen in the family Hygrophoraceae. It was formally described as a new species in 2016 by Bibiana Moncada, Jorge Alberto Molina, and Robert Lücking. The specific epithet crispoleslia combines the Latin word crispulus ("curly") with the middle name of mycologist David Leslie Hawksworth.

References

crispoleslia
Lichen species
Lichens described in 2016
Lichens of Colombia
Taxa named by Robert Lücking
Basidiolichens
Lichens of Ecuador